Lewis Hill may refer to:

Lewis Hill (radio company founder) (1919–1957), co-founder of Pacifica Radio
Lewis Hill (cricketer, born 1990), English cricketer
Lewis Hill (cricketer, born 1860) (1860–1940), English cricketer
Lew Hill (basketball) (1964/65–2021), American basketball coach

See also
Louis Hill (disambiguation)